William A. Birdthistle (born October 20, 1973) is the Director of the Division of Investment Management at the U.S. Securities and Exchange Commission.

Early life and education
Birdthistle was born in Cork, Ireland, and is a citizen of both the Republic of Ireland and the United States. He spent eight years living in Brega, Libya, and nine years in Kuala Lumpur, Malaysia, before coming to the United States in 1991 for his undergraduate studies.

He attended Duke University for his Bachelor of Arts degrees in English and psychology, where he graduated summa cum laude in 1995. He then enrolled at Harvard Law School for his Juris Doctor and served as managing editor of the Harvard Law Review, graduating in 1999.

In 2019, he matriculated at the University of Chicago, where he received an MA in history in 2021 and is currently working on a PhD in history.

Career
Birdthistle spent a year as Judicial Clerk to the Honorable Diarmuid O'Scannlain. He was then an attorney at the Boston law firm of Ropes & Gray from 2001 to 2006. He joined the faculty at Chicago-Kent College of Law in 2006, and received tenure in 2011, when he also won Chicago-Kent's Excellence in Teaching Award.

From 2016 through 2020, Birdthistle served as a visiting professor of law and lecturer in law at the University of Chicago Law School, where he won the Graduating Students Award for Teaching Excellence in 2019.

On December 21, 2021, the Wall Street Journal reported that Birdthistle would join the Securities and Exchange Commission as director of the division of investment management.

Selected publications
 Birdthistle, William A. (2016) Empire of the Fund: The Way We Save Now. Oxford University Press.
 Birdthistle, William A. (2018) Research Handbook on the Regulation of Mutual Funds. Edward Elgar Press (co-edited with John D. Morley).

References 

Living people
1973 births
Harvard Law School alumni
American legal scholars
Duke University alumni
University of Chicago alumni
Irish legal scholars
Irish emigrants to the United States
Naturalized citizens of the United States
People from Cork (city)
Illinois Institute of Technology faculty
Irish expatriates in Malaysia